Anaru Matete (–19 September 1890) was a New Zealand Rongowhakaata leader and farmer. Of Māori descent, he identified with the Rongowhakaata iwi. He was born in East Coast, New Zealand.

References

1890 deaths
New Zealand farmers
Rongowhakaata people
New Zealand Māori farmers
Year of birth missing